The 2014 Larry H. Miller Tour of Utah was the eleventh edition of the Tour of Utah, a seven-stage professional cycling race which took place from August 4–10, 2014. For the second year in succession, the race was won by Tom Danielson of the  squad.

Teams
Sixteen teams competed in the 2014 Tour of Utah. These included six UCI ProTeams, three UCI Professional Continental and seven UCI Continental teams.

The teams that participated in the race were:

Route

Stages

Stage 1
August 4, 2014 — Cedar City to Cedar City, 

The first of the seven stages took place in Cedar City, and was won by Moreno Hofland of the  team.

Stage 2
August 5, 2014 — Panguitch, to Torrey, 

Stage 3
August 6, 2014 — Lehi to Miller Motorsports Park, 

In Stage 3, from Lehi to Miller Motorsports Park, Moreno Hofland of the  team won his second stage beating out Andrea Palini of the  team in a sprint finish.

Stage 4
August 7, 2014 — Ogden to Powder Mountain, 

Stage 4, going from Ogden to Powder Mountain, was won by Tom Danielson, of the  team.

Stage 5
August 8, 2014 — Evanston to Kamas, 

Stage 5 began in Evanston, Wyoming and finished in Kamas, and was won by Eric Young of the  team.

Stage 6
August 9, 2014 — Salt Lake City to Snowbird Ski and Summer Resort, 

Stage 7
August 10, 2014 — Park City to Park City, 

The seventh and final stage of the Tour took place in Park City, and Cadel Evans recorded his second stage win in consecutive days.

References

External links

Tour of Utah
Tour of Utah
Tour of Utah
Tour of Utah
Tour of Utah